Pyridoxine, is a form of vitamin B6 found commonly in food and used as a dietary supplement. As a supplement it is used to treat and prevent pyridoxine deficiency, sideroblastic anaemia, pyridoxine-dependent epilepsy, certain metabolic disorders, side effects or complications of isoniazid use, and certain types of mushroom poisoning. It is used by mouth or by injection.

It is usually well tolerated. Occasionally side effects include headache, numbness, and sleepiness. Normal doses are safe during pregnancy and breastfeeding. Pyridoxine is in the vitamin B family of vitamins. It is required by the body to metabolise amino acids, carbohydrates, and lipids. Sources in the diet include fruit, vegetables, and grain.

Medical uses
As a treatment (oral or injection), it is used to treat or prevent pyridoxine deficiency, sideroblastic anaemia, pyridoxine-dependent epilepsy, certain metabolic disorders, side effects of isoniazid treatment and certain types of mushroom poisoning. Isoniazid is an antibiotic used for the treatment of tuberculosis. Common side effect include numbness in the hands and feet. Co-treatment with vitamin B6 alleviates the numbness. Pyridoxine-dependent epilepsy is a type of rare infant epilepsy that does not improve with typical anti-seizure medications.

Pyridoxine in combination with doxylamine is used as a treatment for morning sickness in pregnant women.

Side effects
It is usually well tolerated, though overdose toxicity is possible. Occasionally side effects include headache, numbness, and sleepiness.  Pyridoxine overdose can cause a peripheral sensory neuropathy characterized by poor coordination, numbness, and decreased sensation to touch, temperature, and vibration.  Healthy human blood levels of pyridoxine are  2.1 - 21.7 ng/mL.  Normal doses are safe during pregnancy and breastfeeding.

Mechanism
Pyridoxine is in the vitamin B family of vitamins. It is required by the body to make amino acids, carbohydrates, and lipids. Sources in the diet include fruit, vegetables, and grain.
It is also required for muscle phosphorylase activity associated with glycogen metabolism.

History
Pyridoxine was discovered in 1934, isolated in 1938, and first made in 1939. It is on the World Health Organization's List of Essential Medicines. Pyridoxine is available both as a generic medication and over the counter product. Foods, such as breakfast cereal have pyridoxine added in some countries.

References

External links

Pyridoxine mass spectrum

B vitamins
Hydroxypyridines
World Health Organization essential medicines
Wikipedia medicine articles ready to translate
Cofactors
Primary alcohols
Diols

pt:Piridoxina